Maestria Condominiums is a mixed-use building complex under construction in Montreal, Quebec, Canada.

Design
Maestria Condominiums will feature two nearly identical buildings connected by a skybridge at the 26th and 27th floors, respectively. The buildings overlook the Place des Festivals in Downtown Montreal. The buildings will feature 1,750 residences, a small public plaza, and a variety of other amenities.

See also

List of tallest buildings in Montreal
List of tallest buildings in Quebec

References

Skyscrapers in Montreal
Buildings and structures under construction in Canada